Filippo Moscati (born 19 September 1992) is an Italian footballer who plays as a forward for Pro Livorno Sorgenti.

Club career
He played his first game for Livorno on 1 December 2010 in a Coppa Italia game against Bari.

He made his Serie C debut for Pro Patria on 1 September 2013 in a game against Cremonese.

In June 2019, Moscati joined Grosseto.

References

External links
 
 

1992 births
Living people
Sportspeople from Livorno
Footballers from Tuscany
Italian footballers
Association football forwards
Serie C players
Lega Pro Seconda Divisione players
Serie D players
U.S. Livorno 1915 players
U.S. Gavorrano players
Aurora Pro Patria 1919 players
F.C. Grosseto S.S.D. players